Alpha Ibrahim Bah (born 1 January 1990) is a Guinean former professional footballer.

Career
Bah began his career at VV Scharn before joining MVV in the summer of 2008. Bah made his first appearance on 8 August 2008 against FC Zwolle.

External links
MVV Profile
Voetbal International Profile

1990 births
Living people
Guinean footballers
MVV Maastricht players
Eerste Divisie players
Association football forwards
Guinean expatriate footballers
Expatriate footballers in the Netherlands
Guinean expatriate sportspeople in the Netherlands